Air Marshal Sir Harold Thomas Lydford,  (7 May 1898 – 20 September 1979) was a First World War pilot in the Royal Flying Corps and senior commander in the Royal Air Force during the Second World War and the post-war decade.

RAF career
Lydford was commissioned into the Special Reserve of the Royal Flying Corps in 1917. He transferred to the Royal Air Force after the war and served as a pilot with No. 208 Squadron in Constantinople. He served in the Second World War as Deputy Director of Organisation and Director of Organisation at the Air Ministry before being appointed Air Officer Commanding No. 28 Group in 1944 and Air Officer Commanding British Forces Aden in March 1945.

After the War he served as Commandant-General of the RAF Regiment, Air Officer Commanding No. 18 Group and Air Officer Commanding-in-Chief at Home Command before retiring in 1956. In retirement he became a Director of Electro Mechanisms Limited and Chairman of the Royal Air Forces Association.

References

|-
 

|-
 

|-

|-
 

|-
 

|-

1898 births
1979 deaths
British Army personnel of World War I
Royal Air Force personnel of World War II
Companions of the Order of the Bath
Knights Commander of the Order of the British Empire
Recipients of the Air Force Cross (United Kingdom)
Commanders of the Legion of Merit
Royal Air Force air marshals
Military personnel from London
Royal Flying Corps officers